The 2020 European Truck Racing Championship was a motor-racing championship using highly tuned tractor units. It is the 36th year of the championship. An eight-round season was originally slated to begin April 25 at the Hungaroring and end October 4 at the Circuito del Jarama. However, due to the effects of the COVID-19 pandemic, the schedule was delayed, shortened, and rearranged, with a two-round season starting August 29 at Autodrom Most and ending October 18 at the Hungaroring.

Calendar

The original calendar saw all rounds from the 2019 season return for 2020. The rounds at the Hungaroring and the Misano World Circuit switched spots, constituting the only change in order. In addition to the eight championship rounds, test sessions at the Red Bull Ring in Austria were scheduled for June 18 and 19.

Following restrictions put in place due to the COVID-19 pandemic, the schedule was forced to be adjusted. The rounds at the Hungaroring and the Misano World Circuit were postponed, while the rounds at the Circuito del Jarama and Le Mans were moved to fit the postponed races. Additionally, the round scheduled for the Nürburgring was cancelled, leaving the new schedule with 7 rounds. The schedule was revised again with new restrictions, with the Slovakia Ring round cancelled, and the Hungaroring round postponed even further. On September 6, the rounds at Circuit Zolder and Circuito del Jarama were both cancelled. On September 30, the series announced the round at the Bugatti Circuit had also been cancelled. On October 30, the round at Misano World Circuit was cancelled, effectively ending the season after 2 events.

Teams and drivers
A provisional entry list was released on May 15, 2020.

Results and Standings

Season Summary

Drivers championship

As a result of the number of rounds cancelled due to the COVID-19 pandemic, the drivers championship was not awarded for the season.
 
Each round or racing event consists of four races. At each race, points are awarded to the top ten classified finishers using the following structure:

 Race 4 cancelled due to heavy rain.

References

External links
 

2020 European Truck Racing Championship
2020 in motorsport
Truckracing
Motorsport events postponed due to the COVID-19 pandemic